Kingman Township may refer to the following townships in the United States:

 Kingman Township, Kingman County, Kansas
 Kingman Township, Renville County, Minnesota